The Secretariat of the 26th Congress of the Communist Party of the Soviet Union (CPSU) was in session from 1981 to 1986.

Officers

General Secretaries

Second Secretaries

Members

References

External links
 Politburo of the Communist Party of the Soviet Union (Узкий состав ЦК РСДРП(б) - Политическое бюро ЦК РСДРП(б) - Бюро ЦК РСДРП(б) - РКП(б) - Политическое бюро ЦК РКП(б) - ВКП(б) - Президиум - Политическое бюро ЦК КПСС). Handbook on History of the Communist Party and the Soviet Union 1898–1991.

Secretariat of the Central Committee of the Communist Party of the Soviet Union members
1982 in the Soviet Union
1986 in the Soviet Union
1982 establishments in the Soviet Union
1986 disestablishments in the Soviet Union